Koch Island is one of the Canadian Arctic islands in Qikiqtaaluk Region, Nunavut, Canada. Located in Foxe Basin, it is an uninhabited Baffin Island offshore island.

References

Islands of Foxe Basin
Uninhabited islands of Qikiqtaaluk Region